Salvador Sanfuentes (February 2, 1817 – July 17, 1860) was a Chilean lawyer, politician and poet.  He served as Minister of Justice and Public Worship twice, and was elected as MP for the Association of Vallenar.

Sanfuentes was appointed intendant of the Province of Valdivia in 1845 and being tasked with surveying its colonization potential of the territory. To carry out the survey, Sanfuentes commissioned Bernardo Philippi as "provincial engineer".

References

1817 births
1860 deaths
People from Santiago
Government ministers of Chile
Deputies of the IX Legislative Period of the National Congress of Chile
Supreme Court of Chile members
Chilean male poets
19th-century Chilean historians
19th-century Chilean poets
19th-century male writers
University of Chile alumni